Giottino (fl. 1324 – 1369), also known as Tommaso Fiorentino, was an early Italian painter from Florence. His real name was Maso di Stefano or Tommaso di Stefano.

Giottino's father, Maestro Stefano Fiorentino, "Stefano the Florentine", was himself a celebrated painter in the school of Giotto; his naturalism earned him the appellation "Scimmia della Natura", the "Ape of Nature" for his perceived realism. He instructed his son, who applied himself to studying the works of the great Giotto. Since he formed his style on Giotto's works, Maso became known as Giottino. the "little Giotto".

The frescoes in the chapel of San Silvestro in the Florentine Basilica of Santa Croce are attributed to Giottino; these represent the miracles of Pope St Sylvester as narrated in the Golden Legend.

Many other works have been attributed to Giottino including Apparition of the Virgin to St Bernard and a marble statue erected on the Florentine campanile.

Giorgio Vasari, the chronicler of the Italian Renaissance, includes a biography of Giottino in the second part of his famous Lives of the Most Excellent Painters, Sculptors, and Architects (Le Vite de' più eccellenti pittori, scultori, e architettori da Cimabue insino a' tempi nostri).

References

Further reading
 (see index)

14th-century births
14th-century deaths
14th-century Italian painters
Italian male painters
Painters from Florence
Trecento painters
Gothic painters